The Deux Orignaux River is a tributary of the Obatogamau River, flowing into the Regional County Municipality (RCM) of Eeyou Istchee Baie-James , in the administrative region of Nord-du-Québec, in the province of Quebec, in Canada. The course of the river flows entirely into the canton of Dolomieu.

The hydrographic slope of the "Deux Orignaux River" is accessible via route 113 which links Lebel-sur-Quévillon to Chibougamau and passes to the south of the lake.

The surface of the "Deux Orignaux River" is usually frozen from early November to mid-May, however traffic Ice safety is usually from mid-November to mid-April.

Geography

Toponymy 
The toponym "rivière des Deux Orignaux" (English: Two Mooses River) was formalized on September 11, 1987 at the Commission de toponymie du Québec, at the creation of this commission

References

See also 

Rivers of Nord-du-Québec
Nottaway River drainage basin
Eeyou Istchee James Bay